Back of Law railway station served the city of Dundee, Scotland, from 1833 to 1855 on the Dundee and Newtyle Railway.

History 
The station opened in May 1833 by the Dundee and Newtyle Railway. It was situated on the south side of Clepington Road. Trains only served here on Fridays. It closed in July 1855. The site is now occupied by a two-storey house.

References

External links 

Disused railway stations in Dundee
Railway stations in Great Britain opened in 1833
Railway stations in Great Britain closed in 1855
1833 establishments in Scotland
1855 disestablishments in Scotland